The 1974–75 Yugoslav First Basketball League season was the 31st season of the Yugoslav First Basketball League, the highest professional basketball league in SFR Yugoslavia.

Classification 

The winning roster of Zadar:
  
  Jure Fabijanić
  Branko Bakija
  Žarko Bjedov
  
  Bruno Petani
  Branko Šuljak
  Josip Đerđa
  Krešimir Ćosić
  
  
  
  Branko Skroče
  Josip Grdović

Coach:

Scoring leaders
 Nikola Plećaš (Lokomotiva) - ___ points (33.1ppg)

Qualification in 1975-76 season European competitions 

FIBA European Champions Cup
 Zadar (champions)

FIBA Cup Winner's Cup
 Rabotnički (5th)

FIBA Korać Cup
 Jugoplastika (2nd)
 Partizan (3rd)

References

Yugoslav First Basketball League seasons
Yugo
Yugo